Many countries give the title minister of national defence or minister of national defense to their Defence ministers, including:

 Minister of National Defence (Angola)
 Minister of National Defence (Burundi)
 Minister of National Defense (Cambodia)
 Minister of National Defence (Canada)
 Minister of National Defence for Air (Canada)
 Minister of National Defence for Naval Services (Canada)
 Minister of National Defense (Chile)
 Minister of National Defence (Colombia)
 Minister of National Defence (Greece)
 Minister of National Defence (Guatemala)
 Minister of National Defence (Lithuania)
 Minister of National Defence (PRC)
 Minister of National Defence (Poland)
 Minister of National Defence (Turkey)